The 1979 World Junior Curling Championships were held from March 11 to 17 at the Moose Jaw Civic Centre in Moose Jaw, Saskatchewan, Canada. The tournament only consisted of a men's event.

Teams

Round robin

  Teams to playoffs

Playoffs

Final standings

Awards
 WJCC Sportsmanship Award:  Andrew McQuistin

All-Star Team:
Skip:  Sjur Loen
Third:  Lorne Barker
Second:  Hugh Aitken
Lead:  Randy Ursuliak

References

1979 in Saskatchewan
Curling in Saskatchewan
1979 in Canadian curling
World Junior Curling Championships
Sport in Moose Jaw
International curling competitions hosted by Canada
March 1979 sports events in Canada
1979 in youth sport